KRQN (107.1 FM) is a radio station broadcasting a Regional Mexican format. Licensed to Vinton, Iowa, United States, the station serves the Cedar Rapids area.  The station is owned by George S. Flinn, Jr., and is programmed by Gorilla Broadcasting Company. KRQN's transmitter is located east of Vinton near Pleasant Creek State Recreation Area.

History
Prior to September 2011, KRQN aired a classic hits format. On September 9, 2011, at 1:07 p.m., after stunting with clips of top 40 music and liners promoting that "the clock is ticking" and to "lock in a preset" and listen at said time, along with bell tolling sounds and people saying "I", 107.1 flipped to Top 40/CHR as i107.1, launching with Party Rock Anthem by LMFAO. With this move, KRQN took on the market's more established Top 40/CHR, KZIA, and later, KOSY-FM upon that station's debut in August 2014.

On August 30, 2013, a deal was announced in which Townsquare Media would acquire 53 Cumulus Media stations, including the local marketing agreement for KRQN, for $238 million. The deal was part of Cumulus' acquisition of Dial Global; Townsquare and Dial Global were both controlled by Oaktree Capital Management. The sale to Townsquare was completed on November 14, 2013.

On May 1, 2021, KRQN dropped its top 40/CHR format and flipped to conservative talk, supplied by USA Radio Networks, as a result of its LMA with Townsquare Media ending.

On November 18, 2022, KRQN changed its format from conservative talk to Regional Mexican, branded as "El Gallo 107.1". The change came after Gorilla Broadcasting Company (controlled by Steven Lara) began programming the station; Gorilla's other stations (WNMB in North Myrtle Beach, South Carolina, and a local marketing agreement with WLEL in Ellaville, Georgia) also utilize this format and branding.

References

External links

KRQN on RadioMixer

RQN
Regional Mexican radio stations in the United States
Radio stations established in 2005
2005 establishments in Iowa